La Bruja (The Witch) is a 2011 Colombian telenovela starring Flora Martínez, based on the novel of the same name by Colombian writer Germán Castro Caycedo.

Story
The story takes place in the 1970s in Fredonia, Colombia, and is about a witch and a known mafia boss, and the social and economic effects of the traffic in narcotics, the abuses of authority and corruption, and the influence of the United States in the expansion of the drug trade in Colombia.

Cast

References
:es:La bruja (telenovela de 2011) La Bruja (in Spanish)

External links
 Página oficial de La Bruja

2011 telenovelas
Colombian telenovelas
Fictional representations of Romani people
Caracol Televisión telenovelas
2011 Colombian television series debuts
2011 Colombian television series endings
Spanish-language telenovelas
Television shows set in Colombia